Fact-finding may refer to:
 Trier of fact, also called a finder of facts, one or more people who determines facts in a legal proceeding
 United Nations fact-finding mission, a mission carried out by the United Nations to discover facts

See also 
 Fact-checking